Dizocilpine (INN), also known as MK-801, is a pore blocker of the N-Methyl-D-aspartate (NMDA) receptor, a glutamate receptor, discovered by a team at Merck in 1982. Glutamate is the brain's primary excitatory neurotransmitter. The channel is normally blocked with a magnesium ion and requires depolarization of the neuron to remove the magnesium and allow the glutamate to open the channel, causing an influx of calcium, which then leads to subsequent depolarization. Dizocilpine binds inside the ion channel of the receptor at several of PCP's binding sites thus preventing the flow of ions, including calcium (Ca2+), through the channel. Dizocilpine blocks NMDA receptors in a use- and voltage-dependent manner, since the channel must open for the drug to bind inside it.  The drug acts as a potent anti-convulsant and probably has dissociative anesthetic properties, but it is not used clinically for this purpose because of the discovery of brain lesions, called Olney's lesions (see below), in laboratory rats. Dizocilpine is also associated with a number of negative side effects, including cognitive disruption and psychotic-spectrum reactions. It inhibits the induction of long term potentiation and has been found to impair the acquisition of difficult, but not easy, learning tasks in rats and primates. Because of these effects of dizocilpine, the NMDA receptor pore blocker ketamine is used instead as a dissociative anesthetic in human medical procedures. While ketamine may also trigger temporary psychosis in certain individuals, its short half-life and lower potency make it a much safer clinical option.  However, dizocilpine is the most frequently used uncompetitive NMDA receptor antagonist in animal models to mimic psychosis for experimental purposes.

Dizocilpine has also been found to act as a nicotinic acetylcholine receptor antagonist. It has been shown to bind to and inhibit the serotonin and dopamine transporters as well.

An animal model of schizophrenia 
Dizocilpine has a great deal of potential to be used in research in creating animal models of schizophrenia.  Unlike dopaminergic agonists, which mimic only the positive symptoms of schizophrenia, a single injection of dizocilpine was successful in modelling both the positive and negative symptoms of schizophrenia. Another study found that, although repeated low doses of dizocilpine were only successful in mimicking behavioral changes such as a slight hyperlocomotion and decreased prepulse inhibition, repeated administration of a higher dose mimicked both the above changes as well as the neurochemical alterations found in first-episode schizophrenic patients. Not only has temporary use been shown to mimic psychosis but chronic administration in laboratory animals resulted in similar neuropathological changes as in schizophrenia.

Possible future medical uses 
The effects of dizocilpine at NMDA receptors are clear and significant. NMDA receptors are key in the progression of excitotoxicity (a process in which an excessive amount of extracellular glutamate overexcites glutamate receptors and harms neurons).  Thus NMDA receptor antagonists including dizocilpine have been extensively studied for use in treatment of diseases with excitotoxic components, such as stroke, traumatic brain injury, and neurodegenerative diseases such as Huntington's, Alzheimer's, and amyotrophic lateral sclerosis. Dizocilpine has shown effectiveness in protecting neurons in cell culture and animal models of excitotoxic neurodegeneration. The administration of dizocilpine protected the hippocampus from ischemia-induced neurodegeneration in the gerbil. The ED50 (effective dose 50) for neuroprotection was 0.3 mg/kg and the majority of the animals were protected against the ischemia-induced damage at doses greater than or equal to 3 mg/kg, when dizocilpine was given one hour prior to the occlusion of the carotid arteries, although other studies have shown protection up to 24 hours post-insult. Excitatory amino acids, such as glutamate and aspartate, are released in toxic amounts when the brain is deprived of blood and oxygen and NMDA antagonists are thought to prevent the neurodegeneration through the inhibition of these receptors.

Behavioural studies have shown that NMDA receptors are involved in the development of psychological dependence caused by chronic administration of morphine. Dizocilpine suppressed the morphine-induced rewarding effect. It is suggested that stimulating NR2B subunits of the NMDA receptor and its associated kinases in the nucleus accumbens leads to the rewarding effect caused by morphine. Inhibition of this receptor and its kinases in the nucleus accumbens by co-treatment with NMDA antagonists prevents morphine-associated psychological dependence. An earlier study has shown that the prevention of morphine-associated psychological dependence was not due to state-dependency effects induced by dizocilpine but rather reflect the impairment of learning that is caused by NMDA antagonists. This is consistent with studies showing that dizocilpine potentiates the addictive potential of morphine and other drugs (see below).

As an antidepressant, positive results were found in animal models of depression. NMDA antagonists like dizocilpine have been shown in animal models to attenuate the hearing loss caused by aminoglycosides It is thought that aminoglycosides mimic endogenous polyamines at NMDA receptors and produce excitotoxic damage, leading to hair cell loss. Antagonizing NMDA receptors to reduce the excitotoxicity would prevent that hearing loss. Dizocilpine was found to block the development of kindled seizures, although it does not have any effect on completed kindled seizures. Oddly, it was discovered to decrease rabies virus production and is believed to be the first neurotransmitter antagonist to present with antiviral activity. Rat cortical neuron cells were infected with the rabies virus and those incubated with dizocilpine had virus produced reduced about 1000-fold. It is not known how MK-801 has this effect; the rabies virus suspension, without cells, was inoculated with dizocilpine and the drug failed to produce a virucidal effect, indicated that the mechanism of action is something other than direct discontinuation of virus reproduction. It was also tested against herpes simplex, vesicular stomatitis, poliovirus type I, and human immunodeficiency virus. It did not have activity against these other viruses, however. Dizocilpine was also shown to potentiate the ability of levodopa to ameliorate akinesia and muscular rigidity in a rodent model of parkinsonism.  When dizocilpine was administered to rats 15 minutes after a spinal trauma, the long-term neurological recovery of the trauma was improved.  However, NMDA antagonists like dizocilpine have largely failed to show safety in clinical trials, possibly due to inhibition of NMDA receptor function that is necessary for normal neuronal function.  Since dizocilpine is a particularly strong NMDA receptor antagonist, this drug is particularly likely to have psychotomimetic side effects (such as hallucinations) that result from NMDA receptor blockade.  Dizocilpine had a promising future as a neuroprotective agent until neurotoxic-like effects, called Olney's Lesions, were seen in certain brain regions of lab rats. Merck, a drug company, promptly dropped development of dizocilpine.

Olney's lesions 

Dizocilpine, along with other NMDA antagonists, induce the formation of brain lesions first discovered by John W. Olney in 1989. Dizocilpine leads to the development of neuronal vacuolization in the posterior cingulate/retrosplenial cortex. Other neurons in the area expressed an abnormal amount of heat shock protein as well as increased glucose metabolism in response to NMDA antagonist exposure. Vacuoles began to form within 30 minutes of a subcutaneous dose of dizocilpine 1 mg/kg. Neurons in this area necrotized and were accompanied by a glial response involving astrocytes and microglia.

Recreational use 

Dizocilpine may be effective as a recreational drug. Little is known in this context about its effects, dosage, and risks. The high potency of dizocilpine makes its dosage more difficult to accurately control when compared to other similar drugs. As a result, the chances of overdosing are high. Users tend to report that the experience is not as enjoyable as other dissociative drugs, and it is often accompanied by strong auditory hallucinations. Also, dizocilpine is much longer-lasting than similar dissociative drugs such as ketamine and phencyclidine (PCP), and causes far worse amnesia and residual deficits in thinking, which have hindered its acceptance as a recreational drug.
Several animal studies have demonstrated the addictive potential of dizocilpine. Rats learned to lever-press in order to obtain injections of dizocilpine into the nucleus accumbens and frontal cortex, however, when given a dopamine antagonist at the same time, the lever-pressing was not altered, which shows that the rewarding effect of dizocilpine is not dependent on dopamine. Intraperitoneal administration of dizocilpine also produced an enhancement in self-stimulation responding. Rhesus monkeys were trained to self-administer cocaine or phencyclidine, then were offered dizocilpine  instead. None of the four monkeys who were used to cocaine chose to self-administer dizocilpine  but three out of the four monkeys who had been using phencyclidine self-administered dizocilpine, suggesting again that dizocilpine has potential as a recreational drug for those seeking a dissociative anaesthetic type of experience. It was found that dizocilpine administration elicited conditioned place preference in animals, again demonstrating its reinforcing properties.

A multiple drug fatality involving dizocilpine, benzodiazepines, and alcohol has been reported.

See also 
 Dissociative
 Dextromethorphan (DXM)
 Ketamine
 Phencyclidine (PCP)
 Glutamate
 Ibotenic acid
 NMDA receptor
 NMDA antagonists
 Olney's lesions
 Psychosis

References

Further reading 

 
original publications for MK-801:

External links 
 Erowid Dizocilpine experience vault—includes reports from users of Dizocilpine

Nicotinic antagonists
NMDA receptor antagonists
Diarylethylamines
Dissociative drugs
Dibenzocycloheptenes
Designer drugs